"Free Love Freeway" is a song written by Ricky Gervais and Stephen Merchant, who starred in the British comedy series The Office. Gervais first performed the song as David Brent in Series 1, Episode 4 (titled Training) of the show.
From 2018, "Free Love Freeway" also appears in Freeview adverts in the United Kingdom.

Versions

The first version of "Free Love Freeway" was played by Brent during an employee training seminar. He went home to get his guitar and entertained his employees with his original songs he used to sing with his rock band Foregone Conclusion.

In 2004, Noel Gallagher, the former lead songwriter and guitarist for the rock group Oasis, recorded the song with Gervais in a professional studio. The new full band recording, which has an added verse, is available as a special feature on the DVD of The Office Christmas Specials. A longer, one-take version of the song is also available as an easter egg on the series one DVD.

Gervais and Mackenzie Crook (as Gareth Keenan) performed the song at the Concert for Diana at Wembley Stadium in 2007.

In January 2009, Gervais was a guest on BravoTV Inside the Actors Studio season 15 with James Lipton, where at one point of the interview he answered Lipton's question as David Brent. Then Brent obliged the audience by singing his latest song "Free Love Freeway" with a guitar supplied to him by Lipton.

In 2013, Gervais brought back his famous character Brent on his YouTube channel in a web series, "Learn Guitar with David Brent". He plays guitar, gives some tips on how to play and answers fan questions. Among the songs he played are "Free Love Freeway", "Spaceman Came Down", "Ooh, La La" and "Life on the Road".

References

External links
Free Love Freeway song lyrics and guitar chords - from BBC

2001 songs
The Office (British TV series)
Songs from television series
Songs written by Ricky Gervais